Sancey-le-Long is a former commune in the Doubs department in the Bourgogne-Franche-Comté region in eastern France. On 1 January 2016, it was merged into the new commune Sancey.

Geography

Population

See also
 Sancey-le-Grand
 Communes of the Doubs department

References

External links

 Sancey-le-Long on the regional Web site 

Former communes of Doubs